Edward Franc Jones (June 3, 1828 – August 14, 1913) was an American merchant, manufacturer, soldier, author and politician from New York.

Biography
He was born in Utica, New York, the son of Lorenzo B. Jones and Sophronia (Chapman) Jones. He was educated at Leicester, Massachusetts. In 1850, he married Mary A. Tarbell, of Pepperell, Massachusetts.

In 1854, he joined the militia as a lieutenant. In 1861 he joined the 6th Massachusetts Militia as a Major, and he was soon named commander with the rank of Colonel. He led the organization on its famed  march through Baltimore, which sparked the first bloodshed of the American Civil War. His troops traveled onward and helped with the defense of Washington, D.C.

Jones later recruited and commanded the 26th Massachusetts Infantry. On February 24, 1866, President Andrew Johnson nominated Jones for the grade of brevet brigadier general, United States Volunteers, to rank from March 13, 1865, for meritorious services during the war. The U.S. Senate confirmed the award on April 10, 1866.

In 1862, he married Susan Annie Brown, from Boston. In 1865, he served in the Massachusetts House of Representatives.  Soon afterwards, he moved to Binghamton, New York, where he opened a scale manufacturing plant.  He became widely known as "Jones of Binghamton" for his company's advertising, which included the slogan "Jones pays the freight" or "Jones, he pays the freight", to communicate that, unlike his competitors, he would not expect buyers to pay a delivery charge.

Jones served as Binghamton's Police Commissioner, was a Regent of the University of the State of New York, served as President of the State Board of Equalization, and served on the boards of numerous colleges and charities.

He was the Lieutenant Governor of New York from 1886 to 1891, elected on the Democratic ticket with Governor David B. Hill in 1885 and 1888.

In 1905, he published the novel Richard Baxter: A Story of New England Life of 1830 to 1840.

Jones continued to operate his business until he lost his sight at the age of 79, after which his scale works was operated by his son.

He died in Binghamton, New York, and was buried at Mount Auburn Cemetery in Cambridge, Massachusetts.  His home at Binghamton, known as the Gen. Edward F. Jones House, was listed on the National Register of Historic Places in 1982.

In popular culture

Ellis Parker Butler referenced Jones' slogan in The Adventure of the Lame and the Halt, one of his  Perkins of Portland stories. The go-ahead advertising man creates a craze for a vile-tasting tonic water by several means, including the slogan "Perkins Pays the Freight". The slogan itself becomes a national catch-phrase.

See also

List of American Civil War brevet generals
List of Massachusetts generals in the American Civil War
Massachusetts in the American Civil War

References

Eicher, John H. and Eicher, David J. Civil War High Commands. Stanford, CA: Stanford University Press, 2001. .
Hunt, Roger D. and Brown, Jack R. Brevet Brigadier Generals in Blue.  Gaithersburg, MD: Olde Soldier Books, Inc., 1990. .

History of the Military Company of the Massachusetts, Now Called, the Ancient and Honorable Artillery Company of Massachusetts: 1637-1888 by Oliver Ayer Roberts (A. Mudge & Son, 1898)
Broome County in Vintage Postcards by Ed Aswad & Suzanne M. Meredith (Arcadia Publishing, 2000, page 14)
Civil War High Commands by John H. Eicher & John Y. Simon (Stanford University Press, 2001,  ; page 324)

Lieutenant Governors of New York (state)
1828 births
1913 deaths
Politicians from Utica, New York
Union Army colonels
20th-century American novelists
Politicians from Binghamton, New York
Burials at Mount Auburn Cemetery
People of New York (state) in the American Civil War
Regents of the University of the State of New York
Burials in Massachusetts
19th-century American novelists
American male novelists
19th-century American male writers
19th-century American politicians
20th-century American male writers
Novelists from New York (state)
Writers from Binghamton, New York
Writers from Utica, New York
Military personnel from Utica, New York
Businesspeople from Utica, New York
19th-century American businesspeople